James Walter Ellison (April 18, 1964 – June 20, 1996) was the frontman for the band Material Issue.  He tirelessly promoted his band, booked tours, and secured a major-label deal in 1990.  Ellison — along with bassist Ted Ansani and drummer Mike Zelenko  — would lead the renaissance of power pop in the early 1990s.  He committed suicide on June 20, 1996, by carbon monoxide poisoning.

The song "Escape Is at Hand for the Travelin' Man" by The Tragically Hip was written about lead singer Gord Downie's relationship with Ellison and his grief over the suicide.

Ellison grew up in Illinois and attended Glenbard North High School.

References

Further reading 
 "International Pop Overthrow (Revised Edition): An Ode to the Golden Triangle of Power Pop - Material Issue" by Jim Hoffmann, Susquehanna Road Publishing, 2015, 774 pps.

External links 
 

1964 births
1996 suicides
American male guitarists
American male pop singers
American male singer-songwriters
American rock guitarists
American pop rock singers
American rock songwriters
People from Addison, Illinois
Suicides by carbon monoxide poisoning
20th-century American singers
20th-century American guitarists
Singer-songwriters from Illinois
1996 deaths
20th-century American male singers
Suicides in Illinois